Renea gormonti is a species of land snail with an operculum, a terrestrial gastropod mollusk in the family Aciculidae.  This species is endemic to France.

Distribution
This species occurs in the Alpes-Maritimes, France.

References

 Bank, R. A.; Neubert, E. (2017). Checklist of the land and freshwater Gastropoda of Europe. Last update: July 16th, 2017

External links
 Boeters, H. D.; Gittenberger, E. & Subai, P. (1989). Die Aciculidae (Mollusca: Gastropoda Prosobranchia). Zoologische Verhandelingen. 252: 1-234. Leiden

gormonti
Gastropods described in 1989
Endemic molluscs of Metropolitan France
Taxonomy articles created by Polbot